A Faster Horse is a 2015 American documentary film directed by David Gelb about the Ford Mustang. It debuted at the Tribeca Film Festival.

Reception
On review aggregator website Rotten Tomatoes the film has an approval rating of 67% based on 6 critics, with an average rating of 5/10.

Michael Rechtshaffen of Los Angeles Times said that "For a documentary all about the iconic Ford Mustang, A Faster Horse is seriously lacking zip".

According to Helen T. Verongos of The New York Times, "The tidbits we learn are wrapped in an unabashedly promotional tone that overestimates the global emotional attachment to this car's muscular mythos".

References

External links

Ford Mustang
2015 documentary films
American documentary films
Documentary films about automobiles
2010s English-language films
2010s American films